USS Nonsuch was a moderately successful privateer built in 1812 and then an armed schooner in the United States Navy during the War of 1812. She was sold for breaking up in 1826.

Privateer
Nonsuch was built in 1812 in Baltimore, Maryland. Her owner, George Stiles and Company, received a commission for Nonsuch as a letter of marque on 7 October 1812. Under Captain Henry Levely, the schooner soon commenced privateering along the East Coast of the United States and in the West Indies seeking British shipping.

By mistake she attacked and captured the American privateer Joseph and Mary, killing and wounding several of the crew.

Nonsuch attacked two British armed vessels, a ship and a schooner, off Martinique on 28 September. Nonsuch fought these two ships for three hours in an extremely furious battle, causing great confusion and killing or wounding a considerable number of the enemy. Unfortunately damage to her own rigging prevented Nonsuch from pursuing the British ships as they fled to Martinique. Nonsuch suffered three men killed and eight wounded; the British suffered seven killed and 16 wounded.

During her time as a privateer, Nonsuch captured nine vessels, two of which were American vessels with a British license (Lic).

US Navy service
The U.S. Navy purchased Nonsuch at Charleston, South Carolina, on 23 December 1812. Lieutenant James Mork sailed her in January 1813 to carry supplies to the United States Army at Fort Johnson. She then resumed cruising in search of English merchantmen.

Nonsuch captured British schooner Sancho Panza in early April 1813 and took the cutter Caledonia (8 guns and 40 men), of Nassau, Hinson, master, following a bloody seven-minute fight on the 9th. Caledonia had an additional 11 guns, of various sizes, in her hold. She had three men killed, seven wounded (two dangerously), and three men missing; Nonsuch had one man dangerously wounded and two slightly wounded. A report stated that Caledonias crew consisted primarily of blacks.

Nonsuch continued her patrols out of Charleston into 1814. In June, off Charleston Bar, an enemy ship of superior force and speed chased Nonsuch, forcing Nonsuch to throw 11 of her guns overboard in order to escape.

Following the war, Nonsuch cruised in the West Indies. Shifting his flag to Nonsuch, Commodore Perry sailed upriver to negotiate an anti-piracy agreement with President Simón Bolívar. A favorable treaty was signed on 11 August, but by the time Nonsuch started downriver, Perry and many of her crew had been stricken with yellow fever. Commodore Perry died on board the USS John Adams shortly its arrival at Trinidad on 23 August. He was buried at Trinidad with great honors while Nonsuchs crew acted as honor guard.

Returning to the United States, Nonsuch operated off the East Coast and in the Caribbean against piracy and made a short deployment to the Mediterranean.

The U.S. schooner Nonsuch, which sailed from this port about three weeks since for the Mediterranean, has put into Newport in distress, having encountered a severe gale in the Gulf stream on the 18th ult and lost one of her masts, her rudder, and several spars.

Fate
Nonsuch was placed in ordinary at Boston, Massachusetts, in December 1825. She was sold in 1826, and broken up the same year.

Notes, citations and references

Notes

Citations

References
 Cranwell, John Philips, & William Bowers Crane (1940) Men of marque; a history of private armed vessels out of Baltimore during the War of 1812. (New York, W.W. Norton & Co.). 
 Dudley, William S. (1985) The Naval War of 1812: A Documentary History (Government Printing Office).  
 
 

Schooners of the United States Navy
1812 ships